Maize USD 266 is a public unified school district headquartered in Maize, Kansas, United States.  The district includes the communities of Maize, some of northwest Wichita, and nearby rural areas.

Schools
It operates the following schools and programs:
 Maize High School (9-12)
 Maize South High School (9-12)
 Complete High School Maize (9-12), alternative school
 Maize Career Academy (9-12)
 Maize South Middle School (7-8)
 Maize Middle School (7-8)
 Maize South Intermediate School (5-6)
 Maize Intermediate School (5-6)
 Pray-Woodman Elementary School (2-4)
 Maize South Elementary School (2-4)
 Maize Central Elementary School (K-4)
 Maize Elementary School (K-1)
 Vermillion Elementary School 
 Early Childhood Center (PreK)

See also
 Kansas State Department of Education
 Kansas State High School Activities Association
 List of high schools in Kansas
 List of unified school districts in Kansas

References

External links
 
 Coliseum bull to move to Maize South High School in 2011 - The Wichita Eagle
 Finally a school district boundary map for Maize USD - The Wichita Eagle
 Maize OKs school placement policy calling for boundaries - The Wichita Eagle

School districts in Kansas
Education in Sedgwick County, Kansas